There is also a Seaforth Island in the Whitsunday Islands of Queensland, Australia

Seaforth Island ( or Mulag) is an uninhabited island in the Outer Hebrides of Scotland.  Unlike many other islands of the Outer Hebrides which are mainly surrounded by open sea, Seaforth Island lies in a narrow fjord-like sea loch named Loch Seaforth,  from the open waters of The Minch. 

The island has poor soil which only supports rough grazing.

History
There are no census records indicating inhabitation in the recent past, although the loch area was the subject of border disputes in the 19th century.  In 1851 these were resolved by the unusual decision to allocate the whole of Seaforth Island to both counties, Ross-shire and Inverness-shire, which at the time controlled Lewis and Harris respectively. This situation continued until the 1975 county reorganisation.

Gallery

Footnotes

Islands off Lewis and Harris
Marilyns of Scotland
Uninhabited islands of the Outer Hebrides
Mountains and hills of the Outer Hebrides